Goślinowo  is a village in the administrative district of Gmina Gniezno, within Gniezno County, Greater Poland Voivodeship, in west-central Poland.

History
During the German occupation of Poland (World War II), in 1939, the occupiers carried out expulsions of Poles, who were then placed in a transit camp in nearby Gniezno, and afterwards deported to the General Government in the more eastern part of German-occupied Poland, while their houses and farms were handed over to German colonists as part of the Lebensraum policy.

Transport
The Polish S5 highway runs nearby, west of the village.

Notable people
 Ksawery Zakrzewski (1876–1915), Polish physician, independence activist, co-founder of Polish scouting in Greater Poland, director of the "Sokół" Polish Gymnastic Society in Poznań
 Eugeniusz Czajka (1927–2011), Polish Olympic field hockey player

References

Villages in Gniezno County